A Revolta dos Dândis (English: "The Revolt of the Dandies") is the second album by Brazilian Rock band Engenheiros do Hawaii, released in 1987. Contain the hits "Infinita Highway" (Endless Highway), "Terra de Gigantes" (Land of Giants) and "A Revolta dos Dândis I" (The Revolt of the Dandies I).

Track listing

 "A Revolta Dos Dândis I (The Revolt Of The Dândis I)" – 4:10
 "Terra De Gigantes (Land of Giants)" – 3:59
 "Infinita Highway (Endless Highway)" – 6:11
 "Refrão De Bolero (Bolero's Chorus)" – 4:34
 "Filmes De Guerra, Canções De Amor (War Movies, Love Songs)" – 4:02
 "A Revolta Dos Dândis II (The Revolt Of The Dândis II)" – 3:13
 "Além Dos Outdoors (Beyond the Outdoors)" – 3:33
 "Vozes (Voices)" – 3:35
 "Quem Tem Pressa Não Se Interessa (Who's In A Rush, Doesn't Care)" (Humberto Gessinger; Carlos Maltz) – 2:27
 "Desde Aquele Dia (Since That Day)" – 3:30
 "Guardas Da Fronteira (Border Guards)" – 4:31

Personnel 

Humberto Gessinger – Vocals, 12 String Guitar, Bass
Augusto Licks – Guitar, Harmonica, Hammond organ
Carlos Maltz – Percussion, Gourd, Drums
Julio Reny – Vocals in "Guardas da Fronteira"
Walter Lima – Mixing, Recording technician
Stelio Carlini – Recording technician
José Oswaldo Martins – Cut
Miguel Plopschi – Art direction
Tadeu Valério – Project coordinator, Graphic coordinator

References

1987 albums
Engenheiros do Hawaii albums